Sawtry Village Academy (formerly Sawtry Community College) is a mixed secondary school and sixth form located in the village of  Sawtry, Cambridgeshire a short distance from Peterborough.

Sawtry Community College converted to academy status in April 2015 and was renamed Sawtry Village Academy. The school is now part of the Cambridge Meridian Academies Trust (CMAT).

Management
The current principal is Sarah Wilson, who is assisted by Deputy Principal Simon Parsons and five assistant principals. Wilson was appointed following the resignation of the previous principal, James Stewart. Stewart left the school in summer 2014 after a critical Ofsted report, and was subsequently arrested over allegations of fraud. In October 2017, Stewart was convicted of four counts of fraud and one of misconduct in a public office. Stewart used £85,000 of school funds to pay off personal debts, £6,000 of school funds to cover household bills, and aided and abetted vice-principal Alan Stevens to commit fraud. During the trial, the court heard that Stewart would routinely lock himself in his office—which he refurbished at the expense of the school which cost thousands of pounds—where he had "a private phone line installed to place bets with bookmaker William Hill, and [would] watch horse racing on TV." His office also contained sex toys, condoms, lubricants and alcohol. Stewart was sentenced to 4 years imprisonment by Mr Justice Stuart Bridge at Huntingdon Law Courts. In February 2019, Simon Parsons was appointed Head teacher of Sawtry Village Academy after the previous principal, Sarah Wilson, was appointed as CMAT Executive Principal.

Tutoring System
The school made a decision to change to a Vertical Tutoring System in 2009, this system was originally split into 6 houses but for September 2015 these were reduced to 4 main school houses and 1 sixth form house, to reflect the falling intake of the school. The school implemented the CMAT set of Academy Pledges which students are expected to complete during the course of their time at the academy, at Bronze, Silver and Gold levels.  Pledges are an awards system which offers students a range of character building opportunities that enhance their learning and development. It is an expectation of every pupil to complete their Pledges during their time at the academy.

The Pledge system aims to encourage and support many important qualities in students, such as responsibility, expectation, intuition and citizenship.

References

External links
 Official school website

Academies in Cambridgeshire
Sawtry
Secondary schools in Cambridgeshire